Sidi Taifour (Arabic: سيدي طيفور, is a municipality in El Bayadh Province, Algeria.

References

Communes of El Bayadh Province